Fu Jin (born 1956) is a Chinese academic, author and theater critic.

Fu Jin received his Ph.D in Chinese Literature. He is a professor at the National Academy of Chinese Theatre Arts and Nanjing University. Fu Jin is also the Vice Chairman of the Chinese Literature and Art Association, Member Discussants (on theater and film studies) of the State Council of China, Chief of the Academic Committee of the National Academy of Chinese Theatre Arts, and Director of the Chinese Traditional Drama Research Institute.

Fu Jin has been a critic of Chinese Theatre, Critical Theory,  and Modern Chinese theatre for many years. He has published over ten books and three hundred papers.

Publications 

 "The history of Chinese Theatre" (2014)
 "The Speech of Art and Aesthetics" (2010)
 "To pass the flame of remembrance onto the next generation ---The Theoretical and Practical experiment on Intangible Cultural Heritage in China" (2008)
 "Chinese Theatre History after 1949" (2002)
 "The strength of Grass Roots---Field research on Tai Zhou Traditional Theatre" (2001)

Chief Editor 

 Historical Documentation of Beijing Opera (Volume of Qing Dynasty)  and continuation (2011)
 Theatrical Art journal.
 60 years of Beijing Arts: 1949-2009—Volume of Theatre (2010)

References

1956 births
Living people
Academic staff of Nanjing University
Scholars of Chinese opera